Thomas Watkin may refer to:

Thomas Glyn Watkin (born 1952), Welsh lawyer
Thomas Joseph-Watkin (1856–1915), barrister and officer of arms at the College of Arms

See also
Thomas Watkins (disambiguation)